On 5 January 1953, a Vickers Viking airliner operated by British European Airways crashed on approach to Belfast Nutts Corner Airport, Northern Ireland. The aircraft was on a domestic flight from London Northolt Airport with 31 passengers and 4 crew on board. Twenty-four of the passengers and three crew members died in the accident.

Aircraft
The Vickers Type 610 Viking 1B airliner, powered by two Bristol Hercules 634 14-cylinder radial engines, was registered G-AJDL with manufacturer's serial number 262. It was delivered to British European Airways in March 1949. Originally named Vortex by the airline, it was renamed Lord St Vincent around 1951.

Accident
G-AJDL left Northolt at 07:27, 25 minutes late. Two hours later it was on approach to Nutts Corner. The aircraft then rapidly lost height and hit the pole supporting an approach light a short distance from the aerodrome. This impact caused the aircraft to break up. There was a slight fire after the accident.

Investigation
A board of inquiry was formed to investigate the accident, chaired by David Scott Cairns, QC. It opened in London on 14 April 1953. After hearing evidence, the board concluded that the pilot, Captain Hartley, made "errors of judgement" but that no moral blame was to be attached to him regarding the accident. The board mentioned that hitting the van stopped any chance of the aircraft reaching the runway, and then hitting the building made a tragedy inevitable. The approach lights were found to not be at the top of the poles, to ease maintenance; although that was not judged a factor in the crash, the lights were moved to the top of the poles following the accident. It was also recommended that when the ILS building was rebuilt that it should be offset from the approach path, or that it should be sited underground.

References

Bibliography

Aviation accidents and incidents in 1953
Aviation accidents and incidents in Northern Ireland
19530105
Accidents and incidents involving the Vickers VC.1 Viking
1953 disasters in the United Kingdom
1953 in Northern Ireland
20th century in Belfast
Airliner accidents and incidents in the United Kingdom
January 1953 events in the United  Kingdom